Manfredonia Calcio S.r.l. Sportiva Dilettantistica commonly known as Manfredonia Calcio or just Manfredonia is an Italian association football club, based in Manfredonia, in the Province of Foggia, Apulia. Currently it plays in Serie D.

History

Foundation 

The club, founded in 1932 as Associazione Sportiva Manfredonia. Manfredonia is known for having been the first Italian professional team to play its home matches on a synthetic football field. The club also used Polisportiva Manfredonia as its denomination in 1940–41.

Manfredonia returned to play in the professional leagues only in 2004 (as S.S. Manfredonia Calcio S.r.l.), following 64 years of absence from Serie C. In 2004–05 Manfredonia won promotion from Serie C2 to Serie C1, but finished last in its division in 2007–08 and was directly relegated back down to Lega Pro Seconda Divisione (ex-Serie C2). The club also won the appeal to remain in the professional league in July 2008. The club was initially fail the financial inspection by the Commissione di Vigilanza sulle Società di Calcio (Co.Vi.So.C.) of Italian Football Federation. At the end of the 2009–10 Lega Pro Seconda Divisione season, the company had major financial problems that led the team to failure. According to FIGC, the club had a capital shortfall of €918,661, in May 2010. The membership of the old company in FIGC was finally revoked in 2013.

Refoundation 
Thanks to Article 52 of N.O.I.F., a phoenix club was founded in the summer of 2010 as A.S.D. Manfredonia Football 1932 and began the season in the Eccellenza Apulia. In the following year the club was renamed as A.S.D. Manfredonia Calcio.

In July 2016 the football club was incorporated again as a società a responsabilità limitata (means limited liability company): Manfredonia Calcio S.r.l. Sportiva Dilettantistica.

Colors and badge 
The team's colors are light blue and white.

Rivalry
Manfredonia had a local rivalry with Foggia Calcio. They both from the same province. In 2007 the match ended with multiple injuries among the journalists.

Notable players

former players with international caps
 Ahmed Barusso
 Simone Rota
 Marco Sau
former players who played in Serie A
 Eugênio Rômulo Togni
 Marco Sansovini

References

External links
   

 
Football clubs in Apulia
Calcio
Association football clubs established in 1932
Serie C clubs
1932 establishments in Italy